Adam Tickell FAcSS (born 1965) is a British economic geographer, whose work explores finance, English local governance, and the politics of ideas. He is Vice-Chancellor of the University of Birmingham, and was formerly Vice-Chancellor of the University of Sussex. He also edited the Transactions of the Institute of British Geographers.

Background
Adam Tickell obtained a first-class degree in Geography in 1987 from the University of Manchester and a PhD from the same institution on the social regulation of banking.

Tickell moved jobs frequently, holding positions and professorships at the universities of Bristol, Leeds, Southampton, Birmingham and Royal Holloway, University of London. 

At the University of Bristol, from 2000, he became research director of the Faculty of Social Sciences and Law. Simultaneously, he was the Vice Chair of the Research Grants Board of the Economic and Social Research Council (ESRC).

He later joined Royal Holloway, becoming Dean and Vice-Principal. He joined the University of Birmingham in 2011, becoming  Provost and Vice-Principal. He became the Vice-Chancellor of the University of Sussex in 2016. He became Vice-Chancellor of the University of Birmingham in January 2022.

He is the current Chair of Universities UK Open Access Implementation Group.

Scholarship
Tickell is one a number of geographers active since the 1980s studying the spatial and economic expression of capital, finance, and global markets. Others with whom he has coauthored work include Eric Sheppard, Nigel Thrift and Jamie Peck. In particular, he has explored the nature of post-Fordism and regional decentralisation in the UK.

Tickell's most cited work is "Neoliberalizing space", an article with Jamie Peck in Antipode journal, published in 2002 and cited 4,600 times by 2018.

He was editor of Transactions of the Institute of British Geographers in the mid 2000s  and is a Fellow of the Academy of Social Sciences.

Controversy
In 2018 Tickell attracted hostility from academics and students who felt his academic critiques of neoliberalism were at odds with the stance he took as a Vice Chancellor during the 2018 USS pension dispute over threats to academic pensions. Posters appeared saying "Critiques neoliberalism in academic articles, but privatises the university for cash".  He told The Badger that the UCU strikes would achieve nothing, even though he was once a UCU member and rep; this proved incorrect. The University of Sussex financial statements 2016–17 state that Mr Tickell was paid £267,000 for the period of September 2016 to July 2017, plus £17,000 relocation costs and £9,000 in pension contributions.

In December 2020, during his tenure as Vice-Chancellor, Tickell presided over the largest rent strike in the University's history. Involving over 750 students, it lasted seven months. It was led by the Sussex Renters’ Union in response to yearly increases in rent and poor mental health support and treatment by the University during the COVID-19 pandemic.

In Autumn 2021, the Sussex branch of the University College Union (UCU) strongly criticised Tickell over a statement sent via email to all students enrolled at the University, regarding academic freedom and Kathleen Stock related to transphobia on the university campus. Sussex UCU claimed that Tickell had not upheld the dignity and respect of trans students and staff. UCU also called for an investigation into "institutional transphobia" at the University of Sussex in response to Tickell's statement.

Publications
Thrift, N, A. Tickell, W.H, Rupp and S. Woolgar. (eds.) 2014. Globalization in Practice. Oxford University Press.  
Tickell A., E. Sheppard, J. Peck and T.Barnes (eds.). 2007. Politics and Practice in Economic Geography. Sage.

References

British geographers
Alumni of the University of Manchester
Living people
Fellows of the Academy of Social Sciences
Economic geographers
1965 births
Academics of Royal Holloway, University of London